Charles Ghigna (born August 25, 1946), known also as Father Goose is an American poet and author of children's and adults' books. He has written more than 5,000 poems and 100 books.

Ghigna was born in Bayside, Queens. His parents relocated to Fort Myers, Florida when he was five. Ghigna graduated from Florida Atlantic University with a Bachelor of Arts in 1968 and a Master of Education degree in 1970. In 1974, he became a poet-in-residence and started teaching creative writing at the Alabama School of Fine Arts (ASFA). He subsequently worked on the children's television show Cabbages and Kings and in 1979 taught creative writing at Samford University.

Ghigna's first book of poetry, Returning to Earth, was published in 1989. He published his first children's poetry books in 1992, before leaving ASFA the following year and taking up writing for children full-time.

Ghigna lives in Homewood, Alabama with his wife, the author Debra Ghigna. Their son, Chip Ghigna, is an artist.

References

External links
 

 

1946 births
American children's writers
American male poets
Florida State University alumni
Writers from Birmingham, Alabama
Living people
People from Bayside, Queens
People from Homewood, Alabama
Children's poets